Ha Dae-sung (born 2 March 1985) is a former South Korean football player.

Early life
Ha displayed exceptional footballing talent from early years. In 1997, Ha, who was then attending Incheon Mansoobuk Elementary School, was given the Grand Prize of the Cha Bum-kun Football Awards, which had been established by South Korean legend Cha Bum-kun to discover young talents. His reputation led Bupyeong High School, one of the most famous footballing schools in South Korea, to scout him. However, soon he got a crucial injury on his right knee and had to stop playing football for two years. On his senior year at high school, Ha began to play regularly and helped his school win three national competitions alongside his teammate Lee Keun-ho.

Club career
Ha joined Ulsan Hyundai Horang-i in 2004, but he could not find his place at the club. Having failed at Ulsan, Ha moved to his friend Lee Keun-ho's team Daegu FC in 2006 and made his K League debut. He began to shine with Lee, and Daegu made a sensation in 2008 by playing extremely aggressive football and becoming the joint top-scoring club in the league.

In 2009, Ha moved to Jeonbuk Hyundai Motors. Although Jeonbuk won the league in that season, he failed to secure a regular place in the first team.

Ha moved to FC Seoul in 2010 and helped his club win the league in that season. On 3 January 2012, he was appointed captain of Seoul. After leading Seoul to another league title in 2012, he received interest from various clubs. Dinamo Zagreb reportedly was one of the numerous clubs that made an offer to sign Ha. However, he chose to stay at Seoul. The next year, he was nominated for the Asian Footballer of the Year award after Seoul finished as the runners-up in the 2013 AFC Champions League.

Ha went abroad since 2014 and played in Chinese Super League and J1 League. He returned to Seoul in 2017 and announced his retirement after two years.

Personal life
Ha Dae-sung is a close friend of Lee Keun-ho. The two have known each other since they were 10 and attended the same elementary, middle and high schools.

Ha said that he is exempt from military duty because of an illness he suffered during childhood on a radio show.

His younger brother Ha Sung-min is also a footballer.

Career statistics

Club

International

Honours
Jeonbuk Hyundai Motors
K League 1: 2009

FC Seoul
K League 1: 2010, 2012
Korean League Cup: 2010
AFC Champions League runner-up: 2013

Individual
K League 1 Best XI: 2011, 2012, 2013
Korean FA Goal of the Year: 2013

References

External links
 
 Ha Dae-sung – National Team Stats at KFA 
 
 
 

1985 births
Living people
Association football midfielders
South Korean footballers
South Korea international footballers
Ulsan Hyundai FC players
Jeonbuk Hyundai Motors players
Daegu FC players
FC Seoul players
Beijing Guoan F.C. players
FC Tokyo players
FC Tokyo U-23 players
Nagoya Grampus players
K League 1 players
Chinese Super League players
J1 League players
J3 League players
South Korean expatriate sportspeople in China
Expatriate footballers in China
South Korean expatriate sportspeople in Japan
Expatriate footballers in Japan
2014 FIFA World Cup players
Sportspeople from Incheon